Eupithecia cana is a moth in the family Geometridae. It is found in Chile (Coquimbo province).

The length of the forewings is 7.5–9 mm. The ground colour of the forewings is mostly white, but sometimes greyish white or yellowish white and even brown in one specimen. The hindwings are silky white with many greyish brown transverse lines. Adults are on wing in November and December.

Etymology
The specific name is derived from canus (meaning greyish white).

References

Moths described in 1994
cana
Moths of South America
Endemic fauna of Chile